Eastern Greene High School is a high school in the eastern part of Greene County, Indiana, United States. Even though it is addressed to Bloomfield, the school is physically 12.5 miles away, among several unincorporated communities which are much closer like Cincinnati, Owensburg, Solsberry and Hobbieville.

Notable alumni
 Dusty May – men's basketball coach, Florida Atlantic

See also
 List of high schools in Indiana

References

External links
Eastern Greene High School

Public high schools in Indiana
Schools in Greene County, Indiana
1960 establishments in Indiana
Educational institutions established in 1960